Plionoma rubens is a species of beetle in the family Cerambycidae. It was described by Casey in 1891.

References

Trachyderini
Beetles described in 1891
Taxa named by Thomas Lincoln Casey Jr.